Michael Coghlan (born 15 January 1985) is an English footballer who plays for Northern League club Washington.

A midfielder, Coghlan played in the Football League for Darlington and in non-league football for numerous clubs in the north-east of England.

Football career
Sunderland-born Coghlan began his football career with Darlington. As a 16-year-old, he was playing for their reserve team, and was included in the travelling squad, though not among the matchday 16, for Darlington's League Cup visit to Wolverhampton Wanderers in September 2003. A week later, he was an unused substitute for the Third Division match at home to Southend United, and on 11 October, as a member of "one of the youngest and smallest squads in the Third Division"Coghlan himself had been dubbed "pint-sized"he made his debut in the Football League. He entered the match as a second-half substitute with his team already two goals down at home to Bristol Rovers; it finished as a 4–0 defeat. In the Football League Trophy, against a Hull City side with eleven changes from their previous league match, Coghlan's "low, fierce shot" was blocked, rebounding to Mark Sheeran who scored to reduce Hull's lead to 2–1, but Darlington were eliminated.

He played twice more in the league in December, before joining Northern Premier League club Harrogate Town on loan in March 2004. The manager thought he "maybe struggled with the pace of the game" in his first appearance, in a defeat at Alfreton Town, and he was back with Darlington a few days later. He played regularly for the reserves in 2004–05according to his 2004 profile on the club's website, he had "shown he is a good passer of the ball with plenty to offer in midfield"but in November was one of seven players with contracts due to expire at the end of the season whom manager David Hodgson listed for transfer or loan and told to prove their worth to the club. After spending time with Bishop Auckland, another Northern Premier League club, on loan, Coghlan finished the season with Darlington's reserves, and was released when his contract expired.

He then went on a tour of non-league football in the north-east of England, playing for clubs including Ryhope CA, Durham City, Crook Town, another spell at Bishop Auckland, Sunderland RCA, Jarrow Roofing, Chester-le-Street Town, Seaham Red Star, and most recently Washington.

He also captained Humbledon Plains Farm, a Sunderland-based team, to victory in the 2014 FA Sunday Cup.

References

External links

1985 births
Living people
Footballers from Sunderland
English footballers
Association football midfielders
Darlington F.C. players
Harrogate Town A.F.C. players
Bishop Auckland F.C. players
Sunderland Ryhope Community Association F.C. players
Durham City A.F.C. players
Crook Town A.F.C. players
Jarrow Roofing Boldon Community Association F.C. players
Chester-le-Street Town F.C. players
Seaham Red Star F.C. players
Washington F.C. players
English Football League players
Northern Premier League players
Northern Football League players